Dunger is a surname. Notable people with the surname include:

 David Dunger (died 2021), British paediatric endocrinologist 
 Nicolai Dunger (born 1969), Swedish singer and acoustic songwriter